Olivia Fiechter (born 15 September 1995 in New York) is an American professional squash player. As of February 2023, she was ranked number 9 in the world.

Career
She won the 2018 Rhode Island Open professional tournament, beating Egyptian Menna Nasser in the final.

In 2022, she was part of the United States team that reached the final of the 2022 Women's World Team Squash Championships. It was the first time that the United States had reached the final.

References

1995 births
Living people
American female squash players
21st-century American women